Donbass was a Soviet Emba-class tanker sunk by the  on 7 November 1942, when it was on its way from Arkhangelsk to Reykjavík.

The case aroused considerable later interest due to the widely held assertion that the Soviet  spy Arnold Deutsch was among the passengers killed in the attack, and that he was at the time bound for an espionage mission in the Western Hemisphere.

Legacy
Three American tankers received by the Soviet Union through the Lend-Lease were renamed in her honor.

References

Bibliography

External links
 Fleet register 1880–2005 - Fesco 
 "Донбасс" (1), танкер 

1932 ships
Maritime incidents in November 1942
World War II shipwrecks in the Arctic Ocean
World War II tankers
Shipwrecks in the Barents Sea
Ships built at the Black Sea Shipyard